Anthony Lamont Simmons (born June 20, 1976) is a former American college and professional football player who was a linebacker in the National Football League (NFL) for seven seasons.  He played college football for Clemson University, and earned All-American honors.  He was drafted in the first round of the 1998 NFL Draft, and he played professionally for the Seattle Seahawks, and briefly, the New Orleans Saints of the NFL.

Early years
Simmons was born in Spartanburg, South Carolina.  He attended Spartanburg High School, where he played for the Spartanburg Vikings high school football team and helped lead the Vikings to their first of three consecutive state championships.

College career
Simmons attended Clemson University, and played for the Clemson Tigers football team.  As a freshman in 1995, Simmons earned the starting job at inside linebacker after just five days of practice. He finished the season with 150 tackles, and became the first defensive player ever to be named UPI's national freshman of the year, and received first-team All-Atlantic Coast Conference (ACC) honors.  As a sophomore, he set the Tigers' record for tackles in a season (178) en route to being named an All-American, and earning another first-team All-ACC selection.

Simmons became one of the premier players in the nation as a junior, and was recognized as a consensus first-team All-American.  He led both Clemson and the ACC in tackles (158) and tackles for loss (25) en route to a third-consecutive first-team All-ACC selection.  He also led the Tigers in quarterback sacks (8).

Professional career
Simmons ran a 4.28 and a 4.34 forty-yard dash for scout Larry Greenlee. His speed was part of the reason Simmons was selected in the first round (15th overall) of the 1998 NFL Draft by the Seattle Seahawks. He led the Seahawks in tackles in 2000, 2001, and 2003. He was released by the Seahawks after the 2004 season and sat out 2005 due to injury. He then signed with the New Orleans Saints before the 2006 season but ended up retiring before the season started. He finished his career with 591 tackles (455 solo), 10 sacks, 34.5 tackles for loss, seven forced fumbles, one fumble recovery, 27 pass deflections, nine interceptions for 131 yards, and two touchdowns in just 87 games.

NFL statistics

References 

1976 births
Living people
All-American college football players
American football middle linebackers
Clemson Tigers football players
Sportspeople from Spartanburg, South Carolina
Seattle Seahawks players
New Orleans Saints players